Lee Ann Roripaugh (born 1965) is an American poet and was the South Dakota poet laureate from 2015 to 2019. Lee Ann Roripaugh is the author of five volumes of poetry: tsunami vs. the fukushima 50 (Milkweed Editions, 2019), Dandarians (Milkweed, Editions, 2014), On the Cusp of a Dangerous Year (Southern Illinois University Press, 2009), Year of the Snake (Southern Illinois University Press, 2004), and Beyond Heart Mountain (Penguin, 1999). She was named winner of the Association of Asian American Studies Book Award in Poetry/Prose for 2004, and a 1998 winner of the National Poetry Series.

Early life
Roripaugh was born in 1965 in Laramie, Wyoming. She is the daughter of Robert Roripaugh, poet laureate of Wyoming, and Japanese immigrant, Yoshiko Horikoshi. Her parents met while her father was serving in the US army stationed in Japan, he met her mother and they married in 1956. Growing up in overwhelmingly white Wyoming, in the same state thousands of Japanese Americans were interned in during World War II, Roripaugh grappled with her own mixed race identity. The American West and Japanese culture are visible influences in Roripaugh's work. She earned a B.M. in piano performance from Indiana University, as well as an M.M. in music history and an M.F.A. in creative writing.

Career
Roripaugh is a Professor of English and the Director of Creative Writing at the University of South Dakota. Her interests include Creative Writing (Poetry, Fiction, CNF, Mixed Genres), Contemporary American Poetry, Asian American Literature, Multicultural Literature, Poetics, intersectional identities, ecocriticism, popular culture (particularly  Whedonverse), representations of queer identity in popular culture, and cyborgs. She is also Editor-in-Chief of South Dakota Review. She was appointed to a four-year term as South Dakota's poet laureate in July 2015.

Awards
 Academy of American Poets Prize
 AWP Intro Award
 1995 Randall Jarrell International Poetry Prize
 1998 National Poetry Series, for Beyond Heart Mountain selected by Ishmael Reed
 2000 Asian American Literature Awards finalist
 2001 Frederick Manfred Award for Best Creative Writing
 2003 Bush Artist Fellowship
 2004 Association of Asian American Studies Book Award in Poetry/Prose
 2004 winner of the Prairie Schooner Strousse Award
 2003 Crab Orchard Award Series in Poetry 2nd Place
 2009 Audre Lourde Award for Lesbian Poetry Finalist
 2015 
 2017 Recipient, Women's International Studies Center Fellowship Residency
 2019 Recipient, South Dakota Author of the Year, Awarded by the South Dakota Council of Teachers of English, South Dakota Council of Teachers of English

Selected publications

Books

Anthologies

Ploughshares

References

South Dakota Poet Laureate
1965 births
Living people
People from Laramie, Wyoming
Indiana University alumni
University of South Dakota faculty
Poets from Wyoming
American women poets
21st-century American poets
American women academics
21st-century American women writers